This is a list of the Palestine national football team results from 1953 to the present day that, for various reasons, are not accorded the status of official International A Matches.

Results

1930s

1950s

1960s

1970s

1990s

2000s

2010s

References 

unofficial
Palestine